The 1997 WNBA season was the first season for the Houston Comets. The Comets won the inaugural WNBA Finals.

Offseason

Initial player allocation

WNBA draft

Regular season

Season standings

Season Schedule

|-  style="text-align:center; background:#bfb;"
| 1
| June 21
| @ Cleveland
| W 76-56
| Cooper (25)
| Cooper (8)
| Cooper (5)
| Gund Arena
| 1-0
|-  style="text-align:center; background:#bfb;"
| 2
| June 24
| Phoenix
| W 70-55
| Arcain (23)
| Arcain (8)
| Cooper (3)
| The Summit
| 2-0
|-  style="text-align:center; background:#fbb;"
| 3
| June 26
| New York
| L 60-62 (OT)
| Cooper (20)
| Guyton (9)
| Cooper (3)
| The Summit
| 2-1
|-  style="text-align:center; background:#bfb;"
| 4
| June 28
| @ Utah
| W 76-58
| Cooper (20)
| Guyton (9)
| Cooper (3)
| Delta Center
| 3-1
|-  style="text-align:center; background:#bfb;"
| 5
| June 30
| Los Angeles
| W 71-66 (OT)
| Arcain (17)
| Jackson (8)
| Cooper (5)
| The Summit
| 4-1
|-

|-  style="text-align:center; background:#fbb;"
| 6
| July 2
| @ New York
| L 67-70
| Cooper (19)
| Guyton (8)
| Cooper (6)
| Madison Square Garden
| 4-2
|-  style="text-align:center; background:#fbb;"
| 7
| July 4
| New York
| L 58-65
| Thompson (15)
| Arcain (7)
| Cooper (8)
| The Summit
| 4-3
|-  style="text-align:center; background:#bfb;"
| 8
| July 7
| Charlotte
| W 74-56
| Cooper (21)
| Thompson (9)
| Cooper (6)
| The Summit
| 5-3
|-  style="text-align:center; background:#fbb;"
| 9
| July 9
| @ Phoenix
| L 64-69
| Cooper (16)
| Thompson (7)
| Perrot (4)
| America West Arena
| 5-4
|-  style="text-align:center; background:#bfb;"
| 10
| July 12
| Sacramento
| W 81-69
| Cooper (20)
| Thompson (10)
| Cooper (8)
| The Summit
| 6-4
|-  style="text-align:center; background:#bfb;"
| 11
| July 14
| Utah
| W 79-56
| Arcain, Guyton (17)
| Harris (8)
| Perrot (4)
| The Summit
| 7-4
|-  style="text-align:center; background:#fbb;"
| 12
| July 16
| @ Los Angeles
| L 52-77
| Thompson, Cooper (17)
| Arcain (8)
| Arcain, Cooper (3)
| Great Western Forum
| 7-5
|-  style="text-align:center; background:#bfb;"
| 13
| July 18
| @ Sacramento
| W 82-60
| Cooper (30)
| Jackson (12)
| Perrot (7)
| Arco Arena
| 8-5
|-  style="text-align:center; background:#bfb;"
| 14
| July 22
| @ Phoenix
| W 77-69
| Cooper (32)
| Arcain (7)
| Cooper (6)
| America West Arena
| 9-5
|-  style="text-align:center; background:#bfb;"
| 15
| July 25
| @ Sacramento
| W 86-76
| Cooper (44)
| Guyton (7)
| Arcain (5)
| Arco Arena
| 10-5
|-  style="text-align:center; background:#fbb;"
| 16
| July 29
| Cleveland
| W 64-73
| Thompson (24)
| Thompson (9)
| Cooper (5)
| The Summit
| 10-6
|-

|-  style="text-align:center; background:#bfb;"
| 17
| August 1
| @ Los Angeles
| W 81-57
| Cooper (34)
| Thompson (9)
| Cooper (5)
| Great Western Forum
| 11-6
|-  style="text-align:center; background:#fbb;"
| 18
| August 2
| @ Utah
| L 63-74
| Thompson (20)
| Jackson (6)
| Cooper (5)
| Delta Center
| 11-7
|-  style="text-align:center; background:#bfb;"
| 19
| August 5
| @ Cleveland
| W 76-66
| Cooper (30)
| Arcain (8)
| Cooper (6)
| Gund Arena
| 12-7
|-  style="text-align:center; background:#bfb;"
| 20
| August 7
| Phoenix
| W 74-70
| Cooper (34)
| Thompson (10)
| Perrot (6)
| The Summit
| 13-7
|-  style="text-align:center; background:#bfb;"
| 21
| August 9
| Los Angeles
| W 72-71
| Perrot (19)
| Thompson (10)
| Cooper (8)
| The Summit
| 14-7
|-  style="text-align:center; background:#bfb;"
| 22
| August 11
| @ Charlotte
| W 72-62
| Cooper (39)
| Jackson (7)
| Perrot (7)
| Charlotte Coliseum
| 15-7
|-  style="text-align:center; background:#bfb;"
| 23
| August 12
| Utah
| W 76-56
| Cooper (21)
| Thompson, Guyton (7)
| Perrot (5)
| The Summit
| 16-7
|-  style="text-align:center; background:#fbb;"
| 24
| August 16
| @ Charlotte
| L 71-80
| Swoopes (20)
| Thompson (6)
| Perrot (7)
| Charlotte Coliseum
| 16-8
|-  style="text-align:center; background:#bfb;"
| 25
| August 17
| @ New York
| W 70-55
| Cooper (17)
| Thompson, Jackson (12)
| Perrot (6)
| Madison Square Garden
| 17-8
|-  style="text-align:center; background:#bfb;"
| 26
| August 19
| Charlotte
| W 77-69
| Cooper (31)
| Guyton (10)
| Thompson, Cooper (4)
| The Summit
| 18-8
|-  style="text-align:center; background:#fbb;"
| 27
| August 21
| Cleveland
| L 75-76
| Perrot (18)
| Guyton (10)
| Cooper (9)
| The Summit
| 18-9
|-  style="text-align:center; background:#fbb;"
| 28
| August 24
| Sacramento
| L 58-68
| Cooper (16)
| Thompson (9)
| Cooper (5)
| The Summit
| 18-10
|-

|- style="background:#bfb;"
| WNBA Semifinal
| August 28
| Charlotte
| W 70-54
| Cooper (31)
| Thompson (12)
| Cooper (5)
| The Summit
|-  style="text-align:center; background:#bfb;"
| WNBA Championship
| August 30
| New York
| W 65-51
| Cooper (25)
| Jackson (11)
| Cooper (4)
| The Summit
|-

Player stats
Janeth Arcain ranked second in the WNBA in Free Throw Pct with .894
Cynthia Cooper ranked fifth in the WNBA in assists with 131.
Cynthia Cooper ranked sixth in the WNBA in Field Goal Percentage (.470)
Cynthia Cooper ranked third in the WNBA in Free Throw Pct with .864
Cynthia Cooper ranked first in the WNBA in field goals with 191.
Cynthia Cooper ranked first in the WNBA in points with 621.
Cynthia Cooper ranked fifth in the WNBA in minutes per game with 35.1
Cynthia Cooper ranked fifth in the WNBA in steals with 59.
Kim Perrot ranked ninth in the WNBA in assists with 88.
Kim Perrot ranked third in the WNBA in steals with 69.
Tina Thompson ranked ninth in the WNBA in points with 370 points.-
Tina Thompson ranked seventh in the WNBA in total rebounds with 184
Tina Thompson ranked ninth in the WNBA in points per game with 13.2
Tina Thompson ranked seventh in the WNBA in Free Throw Pct with .838
Tina Thompson tied for fifth in the WNBA in blocks with 28.

Playoffs
Won WNBA Finals (1-0) over New York Liberty
Won WNBA Semifinals (1-0) over Charlotte Sting

Awards and honors
Cynthia Cooper, WNBA Most Valuable Player Award
Cynthia Cooper, WNBA Finals MVP Award
Cynthia Cooper, Guard, All-WNBA First Team
Cynthia Cooper: Led WNBA, Field Goals 191
Cynthia Cooper: Led WNBA, 3-Pt Field Goals, 67
Cynthia Cooper: Led WNBA, Free Throws, 172
Cynthia Cooper: Led WNBA, Free Throw Attempts, 199
Cynthia Cooper: Led WNBA, Points, 621 
Cynthia Cooper: Led WNBA, Points per game, 22.2 
Cynthia Cooper: Ranked third in the WNBA in minutes played, 982
Wanda Guyton: Second in WNBA (tied), Offensive Rebounds, 76 
Tina Thompson, Forward, All-WNBA First Team
Van Chancellor, Coach of the Year

References

External links 
 Comets on Basketball Reference

Houston Comets seasons
Houston
Houston
Women's National Basketball Association championship seasons
Eastern Conference (WNBA) championship seasons